Balmaa is a 1993 Hindi-language film directed by Lawrence D'Souza. It stars Avinash Wadhavan, Ayesha Jhulka, Saeed Jaffrey, Anjana Mumtaz in pivotal roles. Balmaa is a not proper Hindi word, but in India people often use the word balma to describe the life partner; i.e. wife or better half.

Cast
 Avinash Wadhavan as Vishal
 Ayesha Jhulka as Madhu
 Saeed Jaffrey as Madhu's Uncle
 Anjana Mumtaz as Vishal's Mother
 Shammi as Mrs. Pinto

Soundtrack
The music was composed by Nadeem-Shravan and the lyrics by Sameer Anjaan.

Trivia
At the end of the movie Dil Ka Kya Kasoor, Seema, the young daughter of Arun and Meena, writes a poem that goes: "Agar Zindagi Ho Tere Sang Ho, Agar Maut Ho To Woh Ho Tujhse Pehle..." 

This poem features in a song for the film Balmaa (1993) that was made one year later. Coincidentally, Lawrence D'Souza is the director for both Dil Ka Kya Kasoor (1992) and Balmaa (1993).

External links
 

1993 films
1990s Hindi-language films
Films scored by Nadeem–Shravan
Films directed by Lawrence D'Souza